Events from the year 1582 in the Kingdom of Scotland.

Incumbents
Monarch – James VI

Events
 22 August – Raid of Ruthven: a political conspiracy of Presbyterian nobles abduct the King.
George Buchanan's History of Scotland (Rerum Scoticarum Historia) is first published, in Edinburgh.
Donald Monro's Description of the Western Isles of Scotland (1549) is first published.

Births
 28 January – John Barclay, writer, satirist and poet (died 1621 in Rome)
 7 August – William Douglas, 7th Earl of Morton, Lord High Treasurer of Scotland (died 1648)
William Lithgow, traveller, writer and alleged spy (died 1645)

Deaths
 3 July – James Crichton, polymath (born 1560) (fatally stabbed in Mantua)
 28 September – George Buchanan, Scottish historian (born 1506)
 Mary Livingston, noble and courtier (born )

See also
 Timeline of Scottish history

References